Soulbizness is a Portuguese band from Lisbon, who mostly sing in English.

Biography
The band was formed by Rodrigo and Filipe Campos, and appeared in the course of a contest conducted by TMN (a mobile communications operator in Portugal). The contest called TMN Garage Sessions determined that the 2007 winners would be the Soulbizness. Since then, the band gained some notoriety mainly in its homeland, taking part in the 2007 edition of the Festival Sudoeste.

In 2008 they made their first studio recording in the form of an EP, which was called Collectables. Their second EP entitled 2nd Shake was released in 2010.

Discography
 Collectables (2008)
 Oh Sugar
 TMHSR (Teenage Mutant High School Rockers)
 Not the Man
 Mouthful

 2nd Shake (2010)
 Turn to Rainbows
 Room 108
 Victimless Crime
 Devil’s Way

References

External links
 MySpace profile 
 Facebook fan page

Portuguese musical groups